Kwun Tong Football Association is a Hong Kong football club which currently competes in the Hong Kong Second Division.

The club plays the majority of its home matches at Kowloon Bay Park.

Honours

Cup
Hong Kong Second Division League Cup
 Champions (1): 2022

References

External links
Kwun Tong District Football Club 
Kwun Tong at HKFA

Football clubs in Hong Kong
Hong Kong Second Division League
2002 establishments in Hong Kong